The 1983 Giro d'Italia was the 66th running of the Giro. It started in Brescia, on 12 May, with an  prologue and concluded in Udine, on 5 June, with a  individual time trial. A total of 162 riders from eighteen teams entered the 22-stage race, that was won by Italian Giuseppe Saronni of the Del Tongo-Colnago team. The second and third places were taken by Italian Roberto Visentini and Spaniard Alberto Fernández, respectively.

Amongst the other classifications that the race awarded, Saronni won the points classification, Lucien Van Impe of Metauro Mobili won the mountains classification, and Vivi-Benotto's Franco Chioccioli completed the Giro as the best neo-professional in the general classification, finishing sixteenth overall. Renault-Elf finishing as the winners of the team classification, ranking each of the twenty teams contesting the race by lowest cumulative time. The team points classification was won by Zor-Gemeaz Cusin.

Teams

A total of eighteen teams were invited to participate in the 1983 Giro d'Italia. Each team sent a squad of nine riders, which meant that the race started with a peloton of 162 cyclists. The presentation of the teams – where each team's roster and manager are introduced in front the media and local dignitaries – took place at the Piazza della Loggia in Brescia on 10 May and was televised in Italy on Network 1. From the riders that began this edition, 140 made it to the finish in Udine.

The teams entering the race were:

Route and stages

The route for the 1983 edition of the Giro d'Italia was revealed to the public by head organizer Vincenzo Torriani on 19 February 1983. Seven of these fifteen stages had summit finishes: stage 4, to Todi; stage 6, to Campitello Matese; stage 9, to Montefiascone; stage 10, to Bibbiena; stage 15, to Orta San Giulio; stage 17, to Colli di San Fermo; and stage 19, to Selva di Val Gardena. The organizers chose to include two rest days. When compared to the previous year's race, the race was  shorter and contained one more time trial. In addition, this race contained one more set of split stages.

Classification leadership

Four different jerseys were worn during the 1983 Giro d'Italia. The leader of the general classification – calculated by adding the stage finish times of each rider, and allowing time bonuses for the first three finishers on mass-start stages – wore a pink jersey. This classification is the most important of the race, and its winner is considered as the winner of the Giro.

For the points classification, which awarded a purple (or cyclamen) jersey to its leader, cyclists were given points for finishing a stage in the top 15; additional points could also be won in intermediate sprints. The green jersey was awarded to the mountains classification leader. In this ranking, points were won by reaching the summit of a climb ahead of other cyclists. Each climb was ranked as either first, second or third category, with more points available for higher category climbs. The Cima Coppi, the race's highest point of elevation, awarded more points than the other first category climbs. The Cima Coppi for this Giro was the Pordoi Pass. The first rider to cross the Pordoi Pass was Spanish rider Marino Lejarreta. The white jersey was worn by the leader of young rider classification, a ranking decided the same way as the general classification, but considering only neo-professional cyclists (in their first three years of professional racing). Although no jersey was awarded, there was also one classification for the teams, in which the stage finish times of the best three cyclists per team were added; the leading team was the one with the lowest total time.

The rows in the following table correspond to the jerseys awarded after that stage was run.

Final standings

General classification

Points classification

Mountains classification

Young rider classification

Team classification

References

Citations

 
Giro d'Italia
Giro d'Italia
Giro d'Italia by year
Giro d'Italia
Giro d'Italia
1983 Super Prestige Pernod